Thinking Out Loud is the third studio album by American rapper Young Dolph. It was released on October 20, 2017, by Paper Route Empire. It features guest appearances from DRAM, Gucci Mane, 2 Chainz and Ty Dolla Sign. Meanwhile, The album's production is handled by Drumma Boy, Zaytoven, Mike Will Made It, Cassius Jay and Honorable C.N.O.T.E., among others.

Background
Young Dolph was involved in a shooting in which he suffered multiple gunshot wounds. Shortly after his release from the hospital, Young Dolph announced the album's title and release date.

Singles
Three of the album's songs were released as promotional singles. "While U Here" was released as the album's first single on October 16, 2017. While "Believe Me" and "Drippy" were released as the second and third singles on October 18, 2017 and October 19, 2017, respectively.

Commercial performance
Thinking Out Loud debuted at number 16 on the US Billboard 200 dated October 31, 2017, with 23,487 album-equivalent units (including 4,689 pure album sales).

Track listing

Notes
  signifies a co-producer

Charts

References

2017 albums
Young Dolph albums
Empire Distribution albums
Albums produced by Mike Will Made It
Albums produced by Zaytoven
Albums produced by Honorable C.N.O.T.E.
Albums produced by Drumma Boy